Andreu Canals Butcher (born 10 February 1973) is a Spanish rower. He competed in the men's eight event at the 1992 Summer Olympics.

References

External links
 

1973 births
Living people
Spanish male rowers
Olympic rowers of Spain
Rowers at the 1992 Summer Olympics
Sportspeople from Toledo, Spain